The 1899 VFL Season was the Geelong Football Club's third season in the Victorian Football League and its third with Jack Conway as captain.

Geelong finished the home and away with 10 wins and 4 losses, finishing in second position. In the final series, Geelong finished with 2 wins and 1 loss, finishing in second position on the Section B Ladder. Geelong failed to qualify for the Grand Final.

The leading goalkicker was Eddy James with 31 goals, who also won the league's leading goalkicker medal for the second time.

Playing List 
26 players were used this season with a total of six playing all 17 matches for Geelong this season. Six players made their debut in the VFL this season, and Eddy James, for a third year in a row, led the goalkicking tally with 31 goals.

Statistics

Season summary 
Geelong were competitive this season finishing the home and away season with a 10-4 record, finishing in second position, and qualifying for the Section B finals. Due to the loss against 6th placed South Melbourne, and despite the "slaughter of innocents" against St Kilda, Geelong were eliminated due to South Melbourne's victory over Essendon. Geelong again broke the record for highest score when they met St Kilda in Sectional Round 3. Geelong's score totaled 162 and was the record for twelve years. The record was beaten by Essendon in the 1911 VFL season, when they totaled one more than Geelong, scoring 163.

Results

Ladder

Section B Ladder

References

Geelong Football Club seasons
1899 in Australian rules football